Copernican paradigm is an analysis of Australian constitutional structures in order to develop models establishing Australia as a republic with a directly elected head of state. It is named for Renaissance astronomer Nicolaus Copernicus.

Background
Although a constitutional monarchy, in practice, Australia has most of the essential features of a federal republic. The modern objectives of Australian republicanism are usually viewed in terms of replacing monarchist institutions, in particular the Governor-General, with republican institutions.

Analysis
The paradigm focuses on the Queen of Australia being the central institution of the Australian constitutional system. It is from this central authority, that the executive authority of the Governor-General and each state governor is legally derived.

Model development
Proponents of this analysis argue that their perspective on Australian constitutional structures allows republicans to develop constitutional models that are simpler and with substantively less disruption to parliamentary government. Such models would focus on replacing the Queen alone, retaining the Governor-General and state governors.

In replacing the Queen, a model based on the Copernican paradigm can accommodate a directly elected head of state without codification of the reserve powers, which currently may be exercised by the Governor-General and state governors.

Professor George Winterton, noting this as advantageous, added the paradigm retains the nationally unifying element of a joint state-federal Head of State.

Criticism
In the report of the 2004 Senate Inquiry republican models based on the Copernican paradigm were criticised as understating the amount of constitutional change required to establish a republic. Senators queried the potential for duplication and confusion over the ceremonial roles of the Australian head of state and the Governor-General.

Professor Winterton criticised the concept as "tricephalous" (three-headed) and potentially unstable. He argued a "locally-resident directly-elected public officer" was not readily comparable to a "hereditary absentee monarch" and a future Head of State would interfere with the exercise of the Governor-General's powers to some degree.

See also
 McGarvie Model
 Australian republicanism

References
 The road to a republic, Chapter 7, Report by the Senate Legal and Constitutional Committee's Inquiry into an Australian republic, August 2004.
 Copernican Republic Forum, Articles and forum about the Copernican Paradigm and related republican models.
 The Copernican Gazette, Issue 1, newsletter of the Copernican Group, April 2006.
 Proof Committee Hansard, Senate Legal and Constitutional References Committee about one Copernican republic model, 13 April 2004.
 Democracy - choosing Australia's republic by Richard E. McGarvie, 1999. Discussion of republican models by a former Governor of Victoria.
 Hybrid Republic Model wiki for a Copernican model where the Crown of Australia is democratised, 4 February, 2017.
 Honorary President Model - a full implementation of the Copernican Paradigm examined by a Senate Committee in 2004.

Republicanism in Australia